Paul Mobley is an American photographer. His career as a commercial photographer is grounded in his Midwestern roots. After graduating from Detroit's College for Creative Studies, Mobley moved to New York City to study portraiture. He assisted prominent photographers such as Annie Leibovitz, Steve Steigman, and David Langley before branching out on his own.

Since then, Mobley has worked with a range of celebrity, corporate, advertising, and editorial clients, including American Express, Sony, Citigroup, Ford, Apple, Gourmet, Max Factor, Chevrolet, and Microsoft.

"American Farmer"—his first book—started as a personal project photographing local farmers from his home state of Michigan. It grew into a body of work that "Has led him, down a four-year, nearly 100,000-mile road of capturing farmers from Alaska to Maine and many others". Julie Murphee said, "Paul Mobley confirms my theory that the average American citizen, when they spend enough time with agriculturalists, will fall in love with them. He's their biggest advocate right now."

His second book, "Everyday Heroes", was released in October 2012.  Another deeply personal project that took him cross country photographing "Everyday Americans" who have given their lives to help others.

Paul's third book, "If I Live to be 100" was released in October 2016 by Rizzoli.  This project took Paul to all 50 States, where he photographed an intimate portrait of each Centenarian and profiled their personalities through images and life stories––a tribute to the wisdom that could be lost without some sort of recognition.

His latest book, "American Firefighter", was released October 2017 by Rizzoli. Paul has taken his camera on the road again to photograph America's bravest citizens. In this collection of intimate and powerful photographic portraits, we get a glimpse of what it means to answer the call and run toward danger. Stunning portraits of these brave men and women—chief fire officers, company and wildland crew leaders, instructors, and line-firefighters—are accompanied by firsthand accounts of those who put it all on the line, as well as stories of those firefighters who have made the greatest sacrifice of all.

He lives and works in Los Angeles and New York City with his wife Suzanne and daughters, Camden and Paige. He travels well over 150 days a year working, and trying to find the "next great face".

External links
 Paul Mobley's Official Site

References

Year of birth missing (living people)
Living people
American photographers